Certified Hot Chick is the fifth studio album by American rapper Rasheeda. The digital versions of the album on sites such as Amazon MP3 & iTunes include a bonus song called "Ridin' Fly" which on their versions is track 11, placing a gap between "Fire" and "Drip Drop".

Background
Recording began in early 2008 and Rasheeda was released from her contract with Imperial Records shortly after. The Certified Hot Chick EP was released as a digital download on November 18, 2008, to promote the forthcoming album. The EP included 5 songs from Certified Hot Chick which were "Boss Chick", "Juicy Like A Peach", "Where Ya Been", "Let It Go" and "Yeah"

Singles
The first single from the album, "Boss Chick", peaked at number 65 on the Billboard Hot R&B/Hip-Hop Songs chart. A video was shot for "Boss Chick" as well as the 2nd unpromoted single (originally planned to be "Juicy Like A Peach") "Don't Let Him Get Away" featuring Cherish.

Track listing 
 "So Official"
 "Boss Chick"
 "Show Ya To The Door"
 "Juicy Like A Peach" (featuring Shawnna)
 "Don't Let Him Get Away" (featuring Cherish)
 "Bam" (featuring Kandi Burruss)
 "Meet Cha Mama"
 "Baww" (featuring The 2-9 Boys)
 "Compliment"
 "Fire" (featuring Selasi)
 "Drip Drop"
 "Thang For You" (featuring Kandi Burruss)
 "Your Girl"
 "Sweep The Flo" (featuring Diamond)
 "Where Ya Been"
 "Take 'Em To The Bank"
 "Yeah"
 "Let It Go"
 "Take It Slow"
 "Betta Off Alone"
 "Non-Believers" (featuring Kandi Burruss)

References 

2009 albums
Rasheeda albums